The rank insignia of the Austro-Hungarian Navy were worn on and on sleeves for navy jackets and coats, or on shoulder straps of shirts and white jackets. Officers' ranks were indicated by lines of  gold braid as were senior non-commissioned officers' ranks, enlisted men's rank was indicated by white stars on their square collar flaps.

Rank system
For enlisted men an elaborate rank system existed distinguishing between Mannschaften (crew), Chargen (junior non-commissioned officers), Unteroffizieren (Maaten/NCOs) and Bootsleute/Feldwebel (senior NCOs). In addition the rank indicated the special training the men had received, indicated by a specialty badge worn on the left sleeve. The basic rank would be combined with the specialty resulting in numerous ratings. Non-commissioned officers would be seamen 1st class (one white star) or Gasten and Quartiermeister depending on specialty (two white stars) and Maate (three white stars). Bootsleute would wear the blue or white navy jacket with gold braid half stripes of 11 cm length on the sleeves or shoulder straps. They would be called Meister (master) sometimes Untermeister in the basic rank, the next senior rank would be 'preceded by Stabs-  (staff), and then Oberstabs-.

Enlisted men and Chargen
Career and specialist insignia indicated on left sleeve.

Maate on junior NCO level

Rank insignia senior NCOs

Commissioned Officers

Officers aspirants
Prospective officers would enter the naval academy and become Seekadett (officer cadets) and later Seefähnrich before being commissioned as Fregattenleutnants. Reserve officer candidates would join as Einjährig-Freiwillige (one-year volunteers). These sons of the higher classes who could afford the expenses would then get some training and be commissioned as Korvettenleutnant if successful. Einjährige would also wear the blue navy jacket but with two smaller gold braid stripes.

Officers

Flag officers

Notes

References

 
 
 
 
 
 

Austro-Hungarian Navy
Austria-Hungary